For information on all Mercer University sports, see Mercer Bears

The Mercer Bears football program is the intercollegiate football team of Mercer University located in Macon, Georgia, United States. The team competes in the NCAA Division I Football Championship Subdivision (FCS) and is a member of the Southern Conference. The team plays its home games at the 10,200-seat Five Star Stadium on the university's Macon campus.

History

Mercer's first football team was fielded in 1891, but the school did not consistently field teams until 1906. The sport was dropped in 1917 and 1918 during U.S. involvement in World War I, but returned after  the war. Until 1924, the Mercer Bears were known as the Mercer Baptists.  After the 1941 season, with the beginning of U.S. involvement in World War II, Mercer dropped football again, but did not resume the sport after the war. The program was reinstated after a 72-year hiatus in 2013; the first game was on August 31, 2013, when Mercer defeated (40–37) Reinhardt University in front of an overflow crowd of 12,172 at the Moye Complex.

Mercer football became nationally ranked in the FCS Coaches Poll in 2022.

Conference affiliations
 Independent (1891–1895)
 Southern Intercollegiate Athletic Association (1896–1937)
 Dixie Conference (1931–1941)
 No program (1942–2012)
 Pioneer Football League (2013)
 Southern Conference (2014–present)

Notable former players
The first secretary of the Vacation Bible School Department of Nashville's Baptist Sunday School Department (now Lifeway) was Homer Grice, a prominent Mercer player. Georgia Tech player and later Hall of Fame coach Bill Alexander called Grice "the meanest and toughest guy I ever ran across on a gridiron."

Brothers Crook Smith and Phoney Smith were both stars for Mercer.

Famous University of Georgia football coach Wally Butts, who led UGA to four Southeastern Conference titles and two National Championships, played end for Mercer from 1925 to 1928.

Les Olsson, known around Mercer as "Swede," was the only Mercer player from the pre-World War II era to go pro, playing for the Washington Redskins from 1934 to 1938. He was part of the 1937 championship squad.

Year-by-year results

On August 31, 2013, Mercer played its first game since 1941 before an overflow crowd of 12,172 spectators. The Bears' opponent, Reinhardt University, also revived its football program, having last played in 1920. In a thrilling game that saw multiple lead changes, Josh Shutter helped Mercer clinch the victory with a 31-yard field goal with three seconds left in the game. Mercer won 40–37.

References

External links
 

 
American football teams established in 1892
1892 establishments in Georgia (U.S. state)